Live at Convocation Hall is a live album by Canadian singer-songwriter Hayden, released in 2002 on Hardwood Records and Universal Music Canada.

The album was recorded at the University of Toronto's Convocation Hall.

Track listing 
All songs written by Paul Hayden Desser, except where noted.

Disc One 
 "Streetcar" – 4:53
 "I Should Have Been Watching You" – 3:12
 "Steps into Miles" – 3:12
 "The Hazards of Sitting Beneath Palm Trees" – 3:32
 "Holster" – 4:20
 "Middle of July" – 2:32
 "Between Us to Hold" – 2:50
 "I'm to Blame" – 2:29
 "Bass Song" – 4:51
 "We Don't Mind" – 5:17
 "Stem" – 2:14

Disc Two 
 "Two Doors" – 5:17
 "I Don't Think We Should Ever Meet" – 3:21
 "Woody" – 1:37
 "Long Way Down" – 4:32
 "All in One Move" – 1:59
 "Bad as They Seem" – 4:22
 "Lullaby" – 7:25
 "Pots and Pans" – 3:26
 "Trees Lounge" (Desser, Steve Buscemi) – 4:05
 "Tell Me Why" (Neil Young) – 3:53
 "Carried Away" – 3:13

References 

Hayden (musician) albums
2002 live albums